Wiener Blut (Viennese Blood or Viennese Spirit) is an operetta named after the "Wiener Blut" waltz, supposedly with music by the composer Johann Strauss the Younger, who did not live to witness the première. Such was the popularity of the original "Wiener Blut" Op. 354 waltz until the time of the composer's death that his work would be chosen as the name of the operetta with libretto by Victor Léon and Leo Stein set around the Vienna Congress of 1814 to 1815.

Strauss did not specifically compose any music for this operetta, although many of his earlier compositions were incorporated for the work.  He took no active part in the musical arrangement at its conception nor any production work leading up to its première. He was content to delegate these tasks to Adolf Müller Jr. as he himself was busy with his ballet Aschenbrödel in 1898. However, Müller did not confine himself to the music of Johann Jr., and several dance tunes by his brother Josef were also incorporated in the score.

Performance history
The new operetta premiered at the Carltheater on 26 October 1899, almost five months after Strauss' demise. Franz Jauner staged the costly project.  Jauner anticipated great success at its premiere but was dejected when the work only survived 30 consecutive performances before making way for Sidney Jones' critically acclaimed operetta The Geisha. On 23 February 1900, Jauner fatally shot himself at his desk at the Carltheater after his financial gamble with Wiener Blut failed, effectively bankrupting him.

After five years, however, the famed Theater an der Wien mounted a production of the operetta. With a slightly different libretto and musical arrangement, it caught the public eye and has since retained its popularity on stages around the world. In 2007 English Touring Opera performed a new concert production of Wiener Blut at venues throughout the United Kingdom.

Roles

Adaptations 

In 1942 the operetta was adapted into the film Vienna Blood, which became one of the most financially successful films of the Third Reich.

References 
Notes

Sources
Mailer, Franz, Josef Strauss, Genius Against His Will, Pergamon Press, 1985
 

Operas by Johann Strauss II
German-language operettas
1899 operas
Operas set in Vienna
Operas
Operas completed by others